This list is only of aircraft that have an article, indexed by aircraft registration "tail number" (civil registration or military serial number). The list includes aircraft that are notable either as an individual aircraft or have been involved in a notable accident or incident or are linked to a person notable enough to have a stand-alone Wikipedia article.

Military

Algeria

Angola

Australia

Belgium

Canada

Chile

China

France

Germany

Greece

India

Indonesia

Iran

Israel

Italy

Japan

Kazakhstan

Laos

Myanmar

Morocco

Nigeria

Norway

Peru

Philippines

Poland

Russia

Slovakia

South Africa

Soviet Union

Sweden

Switzerland

Syria

Taiwan

Ukraine

United Kingdom

United States

Including United States Coast Guard aircraft

Venezuela

Civil

Afghanistan

Algeria

Angola

Antigua and Barbua

Argentina

Armenia

Australia

Austria

Azerbaijan

Bahrain

Bangladesh

Belarus

Belgium

Bermuda

Bolivia

Brazil

Bulgaria

Burma

Canada

Cambodia

Cameroon

Chile

China 
(People's Republic of China)

Colombia

Congo, Democratic Republic of

Congo, Republic of the

Cuba

Cyprus

Czechoslovakia / Czech Republic

Denmark

Dominican Republic

Dutch East Indies

Ecuador

Equatorial Guinea

Egypt

Ethiopia

France

Finland

Germany

East Germany

West Germany

Georgia

Ghana

Greece

Guatemala

Honduras

Hong Kong

Hungary

Iceland

India

Indonesia

Iran

Iraq

Ireland

Israel

Italy

Japan

Jordan

Kazakhstan

Kenya

Kyrgyzstan

Korea, Republic of

Laos

Lebanon

Libya

Luxembourg

Malaysia

Malta

Moldova

Mozambique

Mexico

Nepal

Netherlands

New Zealand

Nigeria

Norway

Oman

Pakistan

Panama

Papua New Guinea

Peru

Philippines

Poland

Portugal

Rhodesia

Romania

Russia

São Tomé and Príncipe

Saudi Arabia

Singapore

Slovakia

Slovenia

South Africa

Soviet Union
CCCP are the Cyrillic letters for SSSR, which was the official registration prefix for the Soviet Union. CCCP is generally quoted in English sources, and is used here.

Spain

Sri Lanka

Sudan

Suriname

Swaziland

Sweden

Switzerland

Taiwan
(Republic of China)

Tajikistan

Tanzania

Thailand

Togo

Turkey

Uganda

Ukraine

United Arab Emirates

United Kingdom

United States

Vanuatu

Venezuela

Vietnam

Yemen

Yugoslavia

Zimbabwe

See also 
 Aircraft registration
 Call sign

Explanatory notes 

Tail Number
Tail Number